Pato no tucupi (duck in tucupi sauce) is a traditional Brazilian dish found mostly in the area around the city of Belém in the state of Pará state. The dish consists of a boiled duck (pato in Portuguese) in tucupi.

One of the more typical restaurants where it can be found is the Círculo Militar in Belém, in a historical palace near the harbour of the city.

See also
Brazilian cuisine
Amazonian cuisine

Brazilian cuisine
Duck dishes
Cassava dishes